John Jervis Tollemache, 1st Baron Tollemache (5 December 1805 – 9 December 1890) was a British Conservative Member of Parliament, as well as a major landowner and estate manager in Cheshire. He was raised to the peerage in 1876 as Baron Tollemache, of Helmingham Hall in Suffolk.

Origins
Born in 1805 as John Jervis Halliday, his father was Admiral John Richard Delap Halliday (who in 1821 assumed by royal licence the surname and arms of Tollemache in lieu of Halliday), the eldest son of Lady Jane Halliday, youngest daughter and co-heiress of Lionel Tollemache, 4th Earl of Dysart (died 1770). His mother was Lady Elizabeth Stratford, a daughter of John Stratford, 3rd Earl of Aldborough. His sister was Georgina Cowper-Temple, Lady Mount Temple.

Career
Little is known about his education, but it appears that he received a private education which did not lead to university. He inherited considerable wealth, including Helmingham Hall in Suffolk and estates in Northamptonshire, Cheshire and Ireland.

Tollemache served as High Sheriff of Cheshire for 1840. He was then elected to the House of Commons as MP for Cheshire South from 1841 to 1868, and for Cheshire West from 1868 to 1872. He was raised to the peerage in 1876 as Baron Tollemache, of Helmingham Hall in the county of Suffolk.

Landholdings
Tollemache was the largest landowner in Cheshire, owning . His estate exceeded those of the Duke of Westminster (who owned ), Lord Crewe (with ) and Lord Cholmondeley (with ).

William Ewart Gladstone described him as "the greatest estate manager of his day". Tollemache was generous to his tenants and advocated improvement of their social conditions. He believed in a self-reliant labouring class and popularised the idea of tenants having a cottage with sufficient land to keep livestock. His catch-phrase for this was "three acres and a cow", a policy he carried out in Framsden, a village on the Helmingham Hall estate. In addition to building many cottages, he built over 50 farmhouses, on which project he spent £280,000.

Tollemache's major building project was Peckforton Castle, a new family seat in the form of a Norman-style castle. It was built on a massive scale on the Peckforton Hills within his Cheshire estate. It cost around £60,000 (equivalent to £ as of ), and is deemed the last serious fortified home built in England.

Marriage and issue
He married twice:
Firstly, in 1826, to Georgina Louisa Best (d. 1846), a daughter of Thomas Best, by whom he had  five children, including:
Wilbraham Tollemache, 2nd Baron Tollemache, the eldest son and heir. 
Secondly, in 1850, he married Eliza Georgiana Duff (d. 1918) – who was 24 years younger than him – a daughter of Sir James Duff, by whom he had a further nine children, including:
John. R. D. Tollemache, eldest son by his second wife, who married Eleanor Starnes, a daughter of the Hon. Henry Starnes by his wife Eleanor Stuart.
Douglas Tollemache (1862–1944), Stratford Tollemache (1864–1937) and Mortimer Tollemache (1872–1950), the three brothers who founded Tollemache Brewery.

Death and succession
Tollemache died in December 1890, aged 85. He was succeeded in the barony by his eldest son from his first marriage, Wilbraham Tollemache, 2nd Baron Tollemache.

Coat of arms

References

External links
 
 Peerage.com

Tollemache, John Jervis Tollemache, 1st Baron
Tollemache, John Jervis Tollemache, 1st Baron
People from Cheshire
Tollemache, John Jervis Tollemache, 1st Baron
Conservative Party (UK) MPs for English constituencies
UK MPs 1841–1847
UK MPs 1847–1852
UK MPs 1852–1857
UK MPs 1857–1859
UK MPs 1859–1865
UK MPs 1865–1868
UK MPs 1868–1874
UK MPs who were granted peerages
High Sheriffs of Cheshire
John Jervis Tollemache
Peers of the United Kingdom created by Queen Victoria